Juan José "Juanjo" Ciércoles Sagra (born 27 May 1988) is a Spanish former footballer who played as a central midfielder.

Club career
Born in L'Hospitalet de Llobregat, Barcelona, Catalonia, Ciércoles made his senior debut in the 2006–07 season with RCD Espanyol B, in Segunda División B. After four years with the side – being relegated twice from that level – he was released, and signed a two-year contract with neighbours CE Sabadell FC of the same tier.

In his debut campaign with the Arlequinats, Ciércoles appeared in 26 games (all starts) as the club returned to Segunda División after 18 years. He played his first match as a professional on 1 October, coming on as a late substitute in a 1–0 away win against FC Barcelona B.

After Sabadell's relegation in 2015, Ciércoles continued competing in the third division with that team as well as neighbouring CF Badalona. On 8 January 2018, aged 29, he moved abroad for the first time in his career, joining GIF Sundsvall from the Swedish Allsvenskan on a two-year deal.

References

External links

1988 births
Living people
Footballers from L'Hospitalet de Llobregat
Spanish footballers
Association football midfielders
Segunda División players
Segunda División B players
Tercera División players
RCD Espanyol B footballers
CE Sabadell FC footballers
CF Badalona players
Allsvenskan players
GIF Sundsvall players
Spanish expatriate footballers
Expatriate footballers in Sweden
Spanish expatriate sportspeople in Sweden